(born 11 September 1961, Maizuru, Kyoto) is a Japanese film director and screenwriter.

Career
Shiota attended Rikkyo University, where he was in a film club with other students such as Makoto Shinozaki and Shinji Aoyama and began making 8mm films in the tradition of other Rikkyo students like Kiyoshi Kurosawa. His independently made films were recognized at the Pia Film Festival and he began writing film criticism and working as an assistant for Kurosawa and other filmmakers. He also studied screenwriting under Atsushi Yamatoya, who wrote scenarios for Seijun Suzuki, and worked as the cinematographer for films by Takayoshi Yamaguchi.

His first two films as a director, Moonlight Whispers and Don't Look Back, were both released in 1999 and earned Shiota the Directors Guild of Japan New Directors Award. Don't Look Back also won the Jury Prize at the Three Continents Festival. Harmful Insect (2002) screened at the Venice Film Festival and earned two more awards at the Three Continents Festival. His first major commercial film, Yomigaeri, was the fourth biggest grossing Japanese film of 2003. Canary, his 2005 film inspired by the killings of Aum Shinrikyo in 1995, won the top prize at the Raindance Film Festival. Dororo, based on a manga by Osamu Tezuka, was the eighth top-grossing Japanese film of 2007.

Style and influence
In a San Francisco Bay Guardian interview, Shiota talked about his influences: "Sam Peckinpah, Robert Aldrich, and Don Siegel were directors that I'd admired as the gods of movies since I was in elementary school. [...] In terms of films using youth as protagonists, I love the works by Vitali Kanevsky, the Russian filmmaker. [...] I also have deep admiration for Richard Fleischer and Joseph Losey."

Filmography
 Moonlight Whispers (1999)
 Don't Look Back (1999)
 Gips (2001)
 Harmful Insect (2002)
 Yomigaeri (2003)
 Canary (2005)
 A Heartful of Love (2005)
 Dororo (2007)
 Dakishimetai: Shinjitsu no Monogatari (2014)
 Farewell Song (2019)
 The World with Maki (2022)

Bibliography
 Eigajutsu: Sono Enshutsu wa Naze Kokoro o Tsukamunoka (2014)

References

External links
 
 

Japanese film directors
Japanese screenwriters
1961 births
Living people
People from Kyoto Prefecture
Rikkyo University alumni